Áine Codd is a camogie player, winner of an All-Star award in 2004 and an All Ireland medal in 2007.

Career
She played camogie for Presentation Wexford and was UCD camogie player of the year for 2001. She was nominated for further All Star awards in 2005, 2006 and 2007

Other Awards
She is a daughter of Kit Codd (née Kehoe), former All-Ireland medal winner with Dublin (1965 and 1966) and her native Wexford (1975). Kit also won Gael Linn Cup medals with Leinster in 1965 and 1968, and was on Wexford's first National League-winning team in 1977-'78. Áine's aunts, Bridget, Gretta, Josie and Annie, won All-Ireland Senior medals with Wexford. Two more aunts, Bernie and Eileen, played in All-Ireland finals in the All Ireland Junior and Senior grades. Áine's first cousins include Irish soccer international Kevin Doyle (Bernie's son), current Wexford Senior footballer Kieran Kennedy (Annie's son), and current Wexford Senior hurler Harry Kehoe. In 1996, Áine's brother, Tomás, and brother-in-law, Tom Dempsey, won Winner of All-Ireland Senior medals in hurling medals with Wexford. Her sister, Máire, played with Wexford in the 1992 Winner of All-Ireland Senior medals in camogie final. Áine is married to Monaghan man Micheál McGuinness.

Codd Confusion
Aine is not a blood relative of Deirdre Codd of Duffry Rovers who is also a member of the Wexford Camogie team.

References

External links
 Diet profile in Irish Independent 10 September 2007

Living people
Wexford camogie players
Year of birth missing (living people)
UCD camogie players